A concert band, also called a wind band, wind ensemble, wind symphony, wind orchestra, symphonic band,  the symphonic winds, or symphonic wind ensemble, is a performing ensemble consisting of members of the woodwind, brass, and percussion families of instruments, and occasionally including the harp, double bass, or bass guitar. On rare occasions, additional, non-traditional instruments may be added to such ensembles such as piano, synthesizer, or electric guitar.

Concert band music generally includes original wind compositions, concert marches, transcriptions of orchestral arrangements, light music, and popular music. Though the concert band does have similar instrumentation to the marching band, a marching band's main purpose is to perform while marching. In contrast, a concert band strictly performs as a stationary ensemble.

Origins
The origins of concert band can be traced back to the French Revolution, in which large bands would often gather for patriotic festivals and celebrations. These bands would play popular music that would immediately captivate the public's attention. Throughout the French Revolution, however, serious composers were often not interested in composing music for bands; this was due in large part to the instrumentation. Concert bands were (and still are not) standardized in their required type and number of instruments, making it nearly impossible to write the correct number of parts for the correct types of instruments. The quality of instruments also impacted composers' unwillingness to compose music for concert band. Wind instruments at this time were often difficult to play in tune and had difficulty in switching pitch and rhythm fast enough. This in turn influenced bands to stick with pieces that were transposed from orchestral movements and arrangements, something that has carried into modern day.

During the 19th century, large ensembles of wind and percussion instruments in the British and American traditions existed mainly in the form of the military band for ceremonial and festive occasions, and the works performed consisted mostly of marches. The only time wind bands were used in a concert setting comparable to that of a symphony orchestra was when transcriptions of orchestral or operatic pieces were arranged and performed, as there were comparatively few original concert works for a large wind ensemble.

It wasn't until the early 20th century that composers began writing works for concert band. Concert band composers of this time were frustrated at the lack of quality music for bands, and as such, began writing and performing pieces to remedy this. One of the first and most important concert band arrangements, First Suite for Band by Gustav Holst was written in 1909. Other composers of this time period include Ralph Vaughn Williams, Richard Wagner, and Aaron Copland.

Instrumentation 
Before the 1950s, wind ensembles included various combinations of instruments. The modern "standard" instrumentation of the wind ensemble was more or less established by Frederick Fennell at Eastman School of Music as the Eastman Wind Ensemble in 1952 after the model of the orchestra: a pool of players from which a composer can select in order to create different sonorities. According to Fennell, the wind ensemble was not revolutionary, but developed naturally out of the music.

Bands today

Military bands

A military band is a group of personnel that performs musical duties for military functions, usually for the armed forces. A typical military band consists mostly of wind and percussion instruments. The conductor of a band commonly bears the title of Bandmaster or Director of Music. Ottoman military bands are thought to be the oldest variety of military marching band in the world, dating from the 13th century.

Military bands were originally used to control troops on the battlefield, using instruments such as drums, bugles, and fifes among others. As communication systems during war became more advanced, the use of instruments on the battlefield as signaling devices fell out of use. From then on, military bands would fulfill a ceremonial role, entertaining troops and playing for the community. As its role shifted so too did its instrumentation. A wider range of instruments was employed to play transcriptions of orchestral works, the bulk of the early wind band repertoire. These military bands evolved into the modern drum and bugle corps and helped to spread the idea of a concert band. A modern military will often have multiple types of bands (e.g. the United States Marine Corps has both a drum and bugle corps and wind ensemble).

Professional bands
Professional concert bands not associated with the military appear across the globe, particularly in developed countries. However, most do not offer full-time positions. The competition to make it into one of these concert bands is incredibly high and the ratio of performers to entrants is narrowly small. Examples of professional non-military concert bands include:
 Dallas Wind Symphony, led by Jerry Junkin
 Tokyo Kosei Wind Orchestra, led for many years by Frederick Fennell, and currently conducted by Takeshi Ooi
 Osaka Shion Wind Orchestra 
 Royal Hawaiian Band, created by royal decree in 1836 by King Kamehameha III

Community bands

A community band is a concert band or brass band ensemble composed of volunteer (non-paid) amateur musicians in a particular geographic area. It may be sponsored by the local (municipal) government or self-supporting. These groups rehearse regularly and perform at least once a year. Some bands are also marching bands, participating in parades and other outdoor events. Although they are volunteer musical organizations, community bands may employ an artistic director (conductor) or various operational staff.

The rise of the community band can partially be attributed to industrialization. As the instruments became easier to manufacture, their availability greatly increased. This meant that many amateurs could now form a town band, their arrangements typically consisting of patriotic tunes, marches, and popular music. The American Civil War marked a turning point in the American community band where many military musicians, either stemming from amateur or professional backgrounds, sought to create their own community band after the war's conclusion. The large number of bands created during this era led to a "Golden Age of Bands", spearheaded by conductors such as John Philip Sousa and Patrick Gilmore. The new forms of twentieth-century entertainment, namely the radio and phonograph, led to decline in community bands. This led to instrument manufacturers, who previously had marketed to the community bands, to focus on schools. The expansion of school music programs would eventually help restore interest in the community band as graduates sought to play in a band together again. 

Notable community bands include:

U.S.A.
 The American Band, Providence, Rhode Island, conducted by Brian Cardany
 Allentown Band, the oldest American civilian band, Allentown, Pennsylvania, conducted by Ronald Demkee
 Brooklyn Wind Symphony, Brooklyn, NY, conducted by Jeff W. Ball
 Lesbian & Gay Big Apple Corps, New York, New York, conducted by Kelly Watkins
 Northshore Concert Band, Evanston, Illinois, conducted by Mallory Thompson
 Salt Lake Symphonic Winds, Salt Lake City, Utah, conducted by Thomas P. Rohrer
 The TriBattery Pops, New York, NY, conducted by Tom Goodkind
 East Winds Symphonic Band, Pittsburgh, PA, conducted by Susan Sands
United Kingdom
 Birmingham Symphonic Winds, conducted by Keith Allen
 Newark and Sherwood Concert Band, Newark, Nottinghamshire, conducted by Colum J O'Shea
 North Cheshire Wind Orchestra, Warrington, Cheshire, conducted by Catherine Tackley
 Nottingham Concert Band, conducted by Robert Parker
 National Youth Wind Orchestra of Great Britain, various conductors
Canada
 Pacific Symphonic Wind Ensemble, Vancouver. David Branter, Resident Conductor and Acting Music Director
Australia
 North West Wind Ensemble, Sydney, James Brice, Musical Director
 Sydney Wind Symphony, Mark Brown, Musical Director
 Queensland Wind Orchestra, conducted by David Law
 Weston Winds, conducted by Peter Shaw
Norway
 Dragefjellets Musikkorps (Bergen Symphonic Band)
 Sandvikens Ungdomskorps, Bergen, conducted by Tormod Flaten and Bjørn Breistein
Portugal
 União Filarmónica do Troviscal, Troviscal—Aveiro, conducted by André Granjo
Finland
 Tikkurilan Soittokunta, Vantaa, conducted by Kimmo Nurmi

School bands

A school band is a group of student musicians who rehearse and perform instrumental music together. A school band is usually under the direction of one or more conductors (band directors). A school band consists of woodwind instruments, brass instruments and percussion instruments, although upper level bands may also have string basses or bass guitar.

In many traditional U.S. high schools, there are multiple band levels, distinguished by skill level or other factors. In such schools, an audition may be required to advance to further band levels, while the common level would be open to anyone. For example, in many U.S. high schools, "Concert Band" refers to the introductory level band, "Symphonic Band" is the title for the intermediate level band, and "Wind Ensemble" is the title for the advanced level band.

Instrumentation

Instrumentation for the wind band is not completely standardized; composers will frequently add or omit parts. Instruments and parts in parentheses are less common but still often used; due to the fact that some bands are missing these instruments, important lines for these instruments are often cued into other parts.

Instrumentation differs depending on the type of ensemble. Middle school and high school bands frequently have more limited instrumentation and fewer parts (for example, no double reeds, or only two horn parts instead of four). This is both to limit the difficulty for inexperienced players and because schools frequently do not have access to the less common instruments.

The standard concert band will have several players on each part depending on available personnel and the preference of the conductor. A concert band can theoretically have as many as 200 members from a set of only 35 parts. The wind ensemble, on the other hand, will have very little doubling, if any; commonly, clarinets or flutes may be doubled, especially to handle any divisi passages, and others will have one player per part, as dictated by the requirements of a specific composition. It is also common to see two tubas and two euphoniums or baritones playing the same part in a wind ensemble.

While largely made up of wind and percussion instruments, string instruments such as the string bass and concert harp are often scored for. The use of a harp dates back to its inclusion in the professional and military bands of John Philip Sousa and Edwin Franko Goldman. Such bands would often contain the top harpists of the country, such as Winifred Bambrick, who was one of the first female instrumentalists to tour with the Sousa Band, and Victor Salvi, who played with the United States Navy Band. Notably, the United States Air Force Band scores for cellos, a practice unique to the ensemble that dates back to the tenure of director George S. Howard.

Complicated percussion parts are common in concert band pieces, often requiring many percussionists. Many believe this is a major difference between the orchestra (which usually lacks a large battery of percussion) and the concert band. While in older transcriptions and concert works, the timpani were treated as their own section as in an orchestra, today in bands the timpani are considered a part of the percussion section. Consequently, the timpani player often will double on other percussion instruments.

Contemporary compositions often call on players to use unusual instruments or effects. For example, several pieces call on the use of a siren while others will ask players to play recorders, whirly tubes, or to sing, hum, snap, clap or even crinkle sheets of paper. The wind band's diverse instrumentation and large number of players makes it a very flexible ensemble, capable of producing a variety of sonic effects.

Instrumentation has developed throughout time to become more efficient for the conditions that marching bands need to play in. For example, clarinets were found to be more suitable than the older oboes and became more widely used in the 18th century. Less heavy and bulky instruments were replaced by trombones and cornets. In the 19th century, band instruments became highly developed as they started to add keys and valves that made certain ranges and notes on instruments easier to navigate and perform, which became a huge game changer for all musicians.

 Woodwinds
 Piccolos 1 (2)
 Flutes 1, 2 (3)
 Alto flute
 Oboes 1, 2
 English horn
 Bassoons 1, 2
 Contrabassoon

 Clarinet in E♭
 Clarinets in B♭ 1, 2, 3 (4, 5)
 Alto clarinet
 Bass clarinets 1 (2)
 Contra-alto clarinet/Contrabass clarinet (often one of either, rarely both)

 Soprano saxophone
 Alto saxophones 1, 2
 Tenor saxophone/ Baritone saxophone/ Bass saxophone

 Brass
 Trumpets or cornets in B♭ 1, 2, 3 (4, 5, 6)
 (Piccolo trumpet)
 (Flugelhorns in B♭ 1 (2))
 (Alto/tenor horns in E♭ 1, 2 (3, 4))
 Horns in F 1, 2, 3, 4
 Tenor trombones 1, 2 (3)
 Bass trombone
 Alto trombone
 Euphoniums or baritone horns 1 (2)
 Tubas (or sousaphones)

 Keyboards
 Piano
 Celesta
 Organ
 Synthesizers

 Percussion
 Examples of non-pitched choices
 Snare drums
 Bass drums
 Tenor drums
 Cymbals
 Tam-tams
 Triangles
 Tambourines
 Güiros
 Timbales
 Slide whistles
 Sleigh bells
 Wood blocks or temple blocks
 Tom-toms
 Bongos
 Congas
 Claves
 Vibraslaps
 Wind chimes
Rain sticks
Whips
Maracas
Finger cymbals
 Drum kits
 Examples of pitched percussion instruments
 Timpani
 Glockenspiels
 Xylophones
 Marimba
 Crotales
 Vibraphone
 Chimes

 Strings
 String bass
 Harp (1, 2)
 Cello
 Electric guitar (1, 2)
 Steel-string acoustic guitar
 Bass guitar

Repertoire

Development of a repertoire

Until early in the 20th century, there was little music written specifically for the wind band, which led to an extensive repertoire of pieces transcribed from orchestral works, or arranged from other sources. However, as the wind band moved out of the sole domain of the military marching ensemble and into the concert hall, it has gained favor with composers, and now many works are being written specifically for the concert band and the wind ensemble. While today there are composers who write exclusively for band, it is worth noting that many composers famous for their work in other genres have given their talents to composition for wind bands as well. This is especially true in Japan, where an enormous market can be found for wind band compositions, which is largely due to commissions by the All-Japan Band Association and leading professional ensembles such as the Tokyo Kosei Wind Orchestra and Osaka Municipal Symphonic Band, as well as the Kappa Kappa Psi and Tau Beta Sigma Commissioning Program, the longest-running commissioning series for wind band in the United States.

Prominent composers for concert band

Early to middle 20th century
Some of the most important names in establishing literature written specifically for concert band in the early and middle 20th century were:

 Robert Russell Bennett
 Aaron Copland
 Norman Dello Joio
 Vittorio Giannini
 Percy Grainger
 Morton Gould
 Howard Hanson
 Paul Hindemith
 Gustav Holst
 Gordon Jacob
 Darius Milhaud
 Martin Mailman

 Vaclav Nelhybel
 Vincent Persichetti
 Alfred Reed
 H. Owen Reed
 Arnold Schoenberg
 Claude T. Smith
 John Philip Sousa
 Igor Stravinsky
 Fisher Tull
 Ralph Vaughan Williams
 Clifton Williams

Late 20th century to the present
Over the last fifty years, many composers have written major new works for wind ensemble. Some of these composers have risen to the forefront as being particularly important in the concert band's development. Others have risen to prominence independently and came to compose music for concert band.  These include

 Samuel Adler
 Brian Balmages
 James Barnes
 Leslie Bassett
 Warren Benson
 Derek Bourgeois
 Jerry Brubaker
 Mark Camphouse
 John Barnes Chance
 Steven Bryant
 Nigel Clarke
 Michael Colgrass
 John Corigliano
 James Curnow

 Greg Danner
 Michael Daugherty
 Ingolf Dahl
 Elliot Del Borgo
 David Del Tredici
 David Gillingham
 Julie Giroux
 Peter Graham
 Donald Grantham
 Edward Gregson
 Jacob de Haan
 Samuel R. Hazo
 Frigyes Hidas
 Jennifer Higdon

 David Holsinger
 Alan Hovhaness
 Karel Husa
 Yasuhide Ito
 Robert Jager
 John Mackey
 Timothy Mahr
 David Maslanka
 W. Francis McBeth
 Johan de Meij
 Lior Navok
 Ron Nelson
 Carter Pann
 Vincent Persichetti
 Jan Van der Roost

 Richard St. Clair
 Gunther Schuller
 Joseph Schwantner
 Alex Shapiro
 Robert W. Smith
 Philip Sparke
 Jack Stamp
 Karlheinz Stockhausen
 James Swearingen
 Frank Ticheli
 Fisher Tull
 Eric Whitacre
 John Zdechlik

Important concert band literature

Wind-band research
During the early 21st century, research on wind band-related topics greatly increased due to the expanded publication activities of organizations that promote band research: Germany-based IGEB (founded 1974), the World Association of Symphonic Bands and Ensembles (WASBE, founded 1983), and US-based organizations Historic Brass Society (founded 1988), National Band Association (NBA, founded 1960), and College Band Directors National Association (CBDNA, founded 1941). 

Publications from these organizations expanded the corpus of research that had been developing since 1964 through the Journal of Band Research, affiliated with the American Bandmasters Association. Internationally notable wind-band researchers include Vincent Dubois on French bands, Paul Niemisto on Finnish bands, Frederick Harris on wind-band conductors, Jill M. Sullivan on US women's bands, Frank Battisti on US bands, David Hebert on Japanese and Polynesian bands, Patrick M. Jones on US military bands, and David Whitwell on European bands and repertoire.

Band associations
Some notable band associations include:
 American Bandmasters Association
 British Association of Symphonic Bands and Wind Ensembles
 All Japan Band Association
 Association of Concert Bands
 Lesbian and Gay Band Association
 National Band Council of Australia

See also
 Ottoman military band
 United States military bands

References

External links
 Community-Music—a resource for community band musicians and conductors
 The Concert Band Portal
 Directory of American Community Concert Bands and Wind Ensembles
 Directory of Canadian Community Concert Bands and Wind Ensembles
 Wind Bands and Cultural Identity in Japanese Schools, by David G. Hebert (Dordrecht and New York: Springer, 2012).

 
Types of musical groups